Napoleon and Uncle Elby was a popular syndicated newspaper comic strip created by Clifford McBride, which launched on June 6, 1932. Over a span of 29 years it was distributed to both American and foreign newspapers. By the mid-1940s, the strip was carried by 80 newspapers.

Publication history 
While drawing such features as McBride's Cartoon (1927) and Clifford McBride's Pantomime Comic (1932), McBride introduced Elby, a character based on his uncle, Wisconsin lumberman Henry Elba Eastman. He soon began to add situations involving Elby's dog, Napoleon.

For a minor syndicate, Lafave Newspaper Features, McBride began Napoleon as a daily strip on June 6, 1932. His Sunday strip was added on March 12, 1933, and the following year, the title was changed to Napoleon and Uncle Elby.

McBride's assistant on the strip was former Disney artist Roger Armstrong (1917–2007). After McBride's 1951 death in Altadena, California, his second wife, Margot Fischer McBride, wrote the strip, and she hired Armstrong as the illustrator. In 1952, the team switched to the Mirror Enterprises Syndicate in Los Angeles, keeping the strip going for the next eight years. 

The strip was drawn by Joseph Messerli from 1953 to 1956, by Ed Nofziger from 1956 to 1958, and then Armstrong returned for the final two years. The Sunday page ended on November 27, 1955, and the daily strip ended in 1960.

Characters and story
Elby was based on McBride's uncle, Henry Elba Eastman. McBride soon began to add situations involving Elby's dog, Napoleon.

Comics historian Don Markstein described the characters:

Licensing and merchandising
Napoleon became a spokesdog during the 1940s for Red Heart Dog Food. Merchandising included a stuffed toy of Napoleon. Although Napoleon was an Irish Wolfhound, McBride's own dog was Ace, a 190-pound St. Bernard, who sometimes was used for promotional purposes with McBride, including two short films, Unusual Occupations (1941) and Artist's Antics (1946).

Bibliography
Clifford McBride's Immortal Napoleon and Uncle Elby. 1932. 
Napoleon and Uncle Elby Clifford McBride. 1945.
Napoleon: A Complete Compilation, 1932-1933. Clifford McBride. Introduction by Jack Herbert. Westport, Connecticut: Hyperion Press, 1977.

References

External links
Roger Armstrong obituary
1932 comics debuts
1960 comics endings
American comics characters
American comic strips
Comics about dogs
Comics characters introduced in 1932
Comic strip duos
Fictional dogs
Gag-a-day comics
Male characters in comics